Matthew Pacifici (born August 31, 1993) is an American former professional soccer player who played as a goalkeeper. After graduating from Davidson College, he played for Columbus Crew SC.

Youth and college career

High school
Pacifici was a varsity soccer player at Charlotte Catholic High School for four years. He compiled at 46-4-4 record during his high school career. His final year, he led the nation with 21 shutouts including 16 consecutive shutouts. Pacifici was part of a 3-A State Championship team in 2008.

College

Wake Forest
Pacifici spent his first year of college at Wake Forest. He sat out the season and received a medical redshirt.

Davidson
Pacifici transferred to Davidson beginning with the 2012 season. Pacifici played in 70 games over the course of his Davidson career going 28-31-10. His career goals against average was 1.45. He was named 2nd team All-Conference in 2014 while recording a 0.65 goals against average and seven shutouts. He was named captain during two of his seasons at Davidson.

Club career
After graduating from Davidson, Pacifici went undrafted but was invited to training camp with the Columbus Crew. During the preseason, he held Real Salt Lake and Colorado Rapids scoreless.   The Crew signed Pacifici to a contract in March 2016.
 A concussion placed Pacifici on the season ending injury list in July. He was forced to retire after developing postural orthostatic tachycardia syndrome following the concussion.

Personal life 
Pacifici became the fifth openly gay current or former Major League Soccer player when he came out on Instagram in January 2019.

References

External links
 Columbus Crew Profile
 Davidson Wildcats Profile
 MLS Profile

1993 births
Living people
American soccer players
Association football goalkeepers
Columbus Crew players
Davidson Wildcats men's soccer players
Gay sportsmen
American LGBT soccer players
LGBT people from North Carolina
American LGBT sportspeople
Major League Soccer players
Wake Forest Demon Deacons men's soccer players